The Southern Railway (SR) gave the designation 2-SL to the small fleet of electric multiple units dedicated for use on the South London lines. None of these units survived long enough in British Rail ownership to be allocated a TOPS class.

Construction
The 2-SL (2-car South London stock, numbers 1801–1808) units were rebuilt in 1929 from the Driving Motor cars originally used in ex-LBSCR AC electric SL stock. They were intended for use on the South London lines. Originally these units had some First Class accommodation in the Driving Trailer car, but this was later declassified to Third Class only. The units were numbered 1901–1908 before 1936, when those numbers were reused for new 2-BIL units. At the same time, 4-SUB unit number 1801 was renumbered 1600.

Formations
Initial formations of these units were as follows:

Withdrawal
The majority of these units were withdrawn in 1954, the exceptions being 1802 (in 1951) and 1807 (destroyed in 1940 during a World War II air raid). All were subsequently scrapped.

References

SR 2SL
Southern Railway (UK) electric multiple units
Train-related introductions in 1929